Windmill Island Gardens is a municipal park located in the city of Holland, Michigan. It is home to the 251-year-old windmill De Zwaan, the only authentic, working Dutch windmill in the United States.

History

The windmill was shipped from the Netherlands to the port of Muskegon, Michigan on the ship Prins Willem van Oranje. It was brought by truck from Muskegon to its present location on Windmill Island. Reconstruction of the mill began in 1964 and the park opened in April 1965. The island, formerly farmed by Henry F. Koop, was chosen because of the favorable wind conditions there. Although originally a peninsula, a manmade canal turned the land into an artificial island. Before the arrival of De Zwaan, it was known as Hyma Island.

On April 10, 1965, Prince Bernhard of the Netherlands became the first visitor to the park and presided over the grand opening.  His ticket and the ten guilder bill he used to purchase it are still on display in the park today.

Windmill Island Gardens today

Each year Windmill Island Gardens hosts approximately 55,000 tourists.  The park is open daily from late April until early October, with the most visitors in early May during the Tulip Time Festival.  Over 100,000 tulips are planted on the island each year in beautiful gardens filled with flowers summer through autumn.  In addition to the windmill, the park includes replicas of several historic buildings in the Netherlands.  In the summer months, visitors may also see the klompen dance, traditionally performed by local high school students during the annual Tulip Time Festival.

After Tulip Time season, tourists continue to enjoy the Island's attractions, and the park frequently hosts weddings and events.  The Island's celebration pavilion can seat up to 300 people.  Wedding ceremonies are typically held outside the park or in the Island's gardens, with receptions and banquets taking place in the pavilion.

External links
Windmill Island Gardens

Holland, Michigan
Uninhabited islands of Michigan
Protected areas of Ottawa County, Michigan
Gardens in Michigan
Parks in Michigan
Islands of Ottawa County, Michigan